Juma al Majid (born in Dubai, United Arab Emirates around 1930) is an Emirati businessman, political adviser, and philanthropist. In 2016, Al Majid was ranked among the richest Arabs in the world.

Juma Al Majid held key positions including Chairman for Dubai Economic Council, Vice Chairman for the UAE Central Bank, Vice Chairman for Emirates Bank International Ltd, Director for Dubai Chamber of Commerce & Industry, and Board Member for AI Nisr Publishing (Gulf News).

Early life and career
Juma Majid was born in Al Shandagah, Dubai in 1930. He was a pearl diver's son. When Juma Al Majid turned 15, his uncle, Ahmad Majid Al Ghurair, asked him to assist him at his shop in Deira, and eventually opened a second small shop for him. He began by selling fabric and switched to air conditioners. By the 1970s, his company had grown to be the second largest distributor of General Electric products, selling up to 700,000 air conditioners per year.

Al Majid met Mohammad Al Gaz in 1952. After the UAE Federation was created in 1971, Al Gaz and Al Majid opened a Pepsi factory in Dubai. He also expanded his firm into carpentry and interior design. Since then, the firm has expanded into transportation and logistics, building, food, and advertising. He also founded Al Majid Investing, an international investment company.

Al Majid later acquired franchise rights for additional international brands in engineering, automotive, office furniture, communication, and tyres from businesses such as Samsung, Hyundai, and Hitachi. Khalid Juma Al Majid is his heir.

Philanthropy
At the start of the 1950s, he collaborated with his colleagues Humaid Al Tayer, Abdullah Al Ghurair, and Nasir Rashed Loutah in establishing the first charitable society in Dubai, with the consent of Sheikh Rashed Bin Saeed Al Maktoum. They established Jamal Abdul Nasser Secondary School for boys and Amna Secondary Schools for girls. In 1983, Juma Al Majid founded the National Charity Schools to assist poor expatriate children in gaining a free education.

In 1987, Al Majid founded the Islamic and Arabic Studies College in Dubai which provides free education to all. This college, which accepts students from the Gulf Cooperation Council (GCC) states, is accredited by Al-Azhar University, Dar Al Uloom College, and the UAE Ministry of Higher Education.

Al Majid founded the Beit Al Khair Society in 1990. He established a public library in 1991, which later evolved into a cultural organisation known as the Juma Al Majid Center for Culture and Heritage, which holds a collection of Arab and Islamic manuscripts.

He established the first Culture and Heritage Centre in Dubai which is considered one of the worlds most popular scientific and cultural heritage centres. He has made significant contributions as a member of the advisory committee for the Centre for The Middle Eastern Studies at the Harvard University, USA.

Recogniton & Awards
2010: Honorary PhD degree from the Institute of Oriental Studies (The Russian Academy of Sciences in Moscow).
2010: Award for International Commitment, The Arab American Institute, USA.
2007: Sultan Al Owais Award for Scientific and Cultural Achievement.
2005: Award for The Year's Personality, The National Council for Culture and Art and Letters, Kuwait.
2005: Merit of Jerusalem honor bestowed by Mahmoud Abbas, President of the Palestinian National Authority.
2003: Voluntary Work Award from His Highness Dr. Shaikh Sultan Bin Mohammad Al Qasimi, Member of the Supreme Council and Ruler of Sharjah.
2001: Excellence Certificate for Islamic services, Ministry of Information, Kuwait.
2001: Honoured by the Arabic Culture Society for his role in preserving Islamic and Arabic heritage, Beirut.

2000: Award of the International Personality for serving Culture and Heritage, from Ministry of Awqaf and Islamic Affairs, by Egyptian President Hosni Mubarak.
1999: Honoured by the Scientific Council ofSt Petersburg University for preserving Islamic heritage.
1999: King Faisal International Award for service to Islam, Saudi Arabia.
1998: Hamdan Bin Rashid Award for Distinguished Academic Performance.
1998: Appreciation award from Her Highness Shaikha Fatima Bint Mubarak, Wife of the late President Shaikh Zayed Bin Sultan Al Nahyan, and Chairwoman of the General Women's Union.
1997: Award from Ministry of Justice and Awqaf, Kuwait.
1995: Education Award, Ministry of Education, UAE
1994: Dubai Quality Award for the Businessman of the Year.
1992: Sultan Al Owais Award for Cultural Personality of the Year.

References

1930 births
Living people
People from Dubai
Emirati businesspeople